Tournado is the eighth live album by Tangerine Dream and their fifty-sixth overall. It is the first live album released by the group to feature no new compositions.

Reception
Dave Connolly of AllMusic gave the album four out of five stars, stating that the album "might be the best place to start" for those interested in works produced by Tangerine Dream in the 1990s.

Track listing

Personnel
 Tangerine Dream
 Edgar Froese - keyboards
 Jerome Froese - keyboards
 Zlatko Perica - electric guitar
Guest musicians
 Emil Hachfeld - electronic drums

References

1997 live albums
Tangerine Dream live albums